"Nights in Ballygran" is the fifth episode of the first season of the HBO television series Boardwalk Empire, which premiered October 17, 2010. It was written by co-executive producer Lawrence Konner and directed by Alan Taylor. 
"Nights in Ballygran" received positive reviews from critics.

The episode is set during Saint Patrick's Day and progresses the relationship between Nucky and Margaret, while also showing how Jimmy is haunted by the consequences of the life he now leads.

The title is taken from the title line of an Irish folk song, “Carrickfergus”.

Plot 
Margaret wakes to see men working for Atlantic City ward boss James Neary offloading barrels of illegal beer into a motor garage behind her house. She meets Nucky on her way to work with a present of soda bread, but he disappoints her with his sudden aloofness and refuses to accept the gift. Quietly, Nucky tells his brother Eli that he is unwilling to involve Margaret in the violent world he lives in. However, Margaret is deeply hurt and tears up the dress she stole earlier.

After discussing the garage at a Temperance League meeting to come up with plans for more direct action against bootlegging, Margaret and a colleague meet with Nucky; he feigns interest but then does nothing. Margaret sees the deliveries again that night; brushed off by Neary and ignored altogether by Nucky, she reports Neary to Van Alden and his colleagues. The agents initially dismiss the operation as one of hundreds in the city that they lack the resources to shut down, but Margaret is able to get Van Alden's attention by mentioning that Neary works for Nucky.

As Nucky and Eli prepare for St. Patrick's Day celebrations with the "Ancient Order of Celts", Eli mentions his coming re-election campaign and presses to "say a few words" at the Order's annual Saint Patrick's Eve Dinner, a gathering of local Irish-American bigwigs. Nucky is skeptical of Eli's efforts to improve at public speaking, but reluctantly accedes. Local dwarves, who normally run exhibition matches at the local boxing ring, are hired to dress up as leprechauns for the dinner. When they complain about the degrading gig, their leader Carl promises to have Nucky double their pay.

In Chicago, Jimmy takes care of Pearl after her disfigurement, but she continues to spiral into depression and laudanum addiction. Torrio orders Capone to throw her out because her scarred face prevents her from working as a prostitute. Jimmy offers to pay for her keep, but soon realizes he can't afford to. Pearl seems to understand her predicament: later that night, she drunkenly flaunts her scarred face in the lounge and, after a last kiss with Jimmy, fatally shoots herself with his gun while he is washing up. Subsequently, Jimmy visits an opium den in Chicago's Chinatown.

Nucky meets with his ward bosses, who anticipate large profits from selling booze on St. Patrick's Day. Nucky jokes about Eli's upcoming speech at the dinner, to the amusement of everyone except Eli. Carl comes to see Nucky, who bribes him into selling the other dwarves on a much smaller raise. Elsewhere, in New York City, Rothstein reads a newspaper article about the unfolding Black Sox Scandal and refutes his lawyer's suggestion that he let it blow over. Gillian tries to convince Angela that she should start over with another man, even offering to raise Jimmy's son for her. Angela angrily rejects her offer and leaves to meet a "friend", who is later revealed to be the owner of a photography studio on the Boardwalk she grew close to during Jimmy's war service.

At the dinner, Eli's speech turns into a disaster when he brings up the Easter Rising, nearly triggering a violent brawl among the attendees and forcing Nucky to intercede. Eli drinks heavily and reveals just how much he resents his brother's natural charm and popularity. Van Alden, acting on Margaret's information, raids the dinner, arrests Neary, has him paraded before a gaggle of reporters, and has the doors to the Order's clubhouse locked and chained before overseeing the smashing of beer barrels. Nucky sees Margaret among the Temperance League members cheering on the raid and realizes she betrayed him. He angrily confronts her that night at home, and they sleep together after giving into their feelings for each other.

Reception

Critical reception 
IGN said the episode was "Outstanding" and gave the episode 9/10.  They said "For those who are still on the fence about Boardwalk Empire's greatness, shut up and watch episode five, "Nights in Ballygran". The episode features the show's strongest character interactions yet, as Margaret's role in the Temperance League threatens both Nucky's political and criminal enterprises as Federal Agent Van Alden applies pressure to both." "The more shows like this make it harder for their main characters to do the right thing - the farther away they get from what the right thing is - is when television approaches being great. With "Nights in Ballygran", Boardwalk pushes past great and puts its sights on landmark."

Ratings 
The episode rebounded a bit to a 1.3 adults 18–49 rating after the previous week's plunge to a 1.1 rating and received a total of 2.850 million viewers.

References

External links 
 "Nights in Ballygran" at HBO
 

2010 American television episodes
Boardwalk Empire episodes
Saint Patrick's Day television episodes